In enzymology, a trans-2-decenoyl-[acyl-carrier protein] isomerase is an enzyme that catalyzes the chemical reaction

trans-dec-2-enoyl-[acyl-carrier-protein]  cis-dec-3-enoyl-[acyl-carrier-protein]

Hence, this enzyme has one substrate, [[trans-dec-2-enoyl-[acyl-carrier-protein]]], and one product, [[cis-dec-3-enoyl-[acyl-carrier-protein]]].

This enzyme belongs to the family of isomerases, specifically those intramolecular oxidoreductases transposing C=C bonds.  The systematic name of this enzyme class is decenoyl-[acyl-carrier-protein] Delta2-trans-Delta3-cis-isomerase. Other names in common use include beta-hydroxydecanoyl thioester dehydrase, trans-2-cis-3-decenoyl-ACP isomerase, trans-2,cis-3-decenoyl-ACP isomerase, trans-2-decenoyl-ACP isomerase, and FabM.

References

 
 
 
 Neidhardt, F.C. (Ed.), Escherichia coli and Salmonella: Cellular and Molecular Biology, 2nd ed., vol. 1, ASM Press, Washington, DC, 1996, p. 612-636.

EC 5.3.3
Enzymes of unknown structure